Harry Thomas Stratford OBE (born 1948) is the founder of Shire, one of the United Kingdom's largest pharmaceutical businesses.

Career
Educated at the University of London, Harry Stratford founded Shire Pharmaceticals in 1986 and remained its Chief Executive until 1994.

In 1995 he founded ProStakan, another pharmaceutical business, and was Chief Executive there until he became Executive Chairman in 2004; he was then Non-Executive Chairman from 2006 until he retired at the end of 2007. In 2008 he became a Non-Executive Director of Merrion Pharmaceuticals.

References

1948 births
Living people
Alumni of the University of London
British businesspeople
Officers of the Order of the British Empire